The Black River is a  tributary of the Red Lake River of Minnesota in the United States.  Via the Red Lake River, the Red River of the North, Lake Winnipeg, and the Nelson River, it is part of the Hudson Bay watershed.

The Black River was so named on account of its peat-stained waters.

See also
List of rivers of Minnesota

References

Minnesota Watersheds
USGS Hydrologic Unit Map - State of Minnesota (1974)

Rivers of Pennington County, Minnesota
Rivers of Red Lake County, Minnesota
Rivers of Minnesota
Tributaries of Hudson Bay